Michelle Gribi (born 29 September 1992) is a Swiss curler.

Teams

Women's

Mixed

Mixed doubles

Personal life
Her brother Reto is also a curler and Michelle's mixed doubles teammate. They won the  together.

References

External links
 
 Michelle Gribi | Bieler Tagblatt 

Living people
1992 births
Swiss female curlers
World mixed doubles curling champions
Swiss curling champions
Place of birth missing (living people)